Skyline High School can refer to:

Skyline High School (Alabama), in Scottsboro
Skyline High School (Arizona), in Mesa
Skyline High School (Lemon Grove, California)
Skyline High School (Oakland, California)
Skyline High School (Colorado), in Longmont
Skyline High School (Idaho), in Idaho Falls
Skyline High School (Kansas), in Pratt
Skyline High School (Michigan), in Ann Arbor
Skyline High School (Missouri), in Urbana
Skyline High School (Montana), in Great Falls
Skyline High School (Oregon), in Oakland
Skyline High School (Dallas)
Skyline High School (Utah), in Millcreek
Skyline High School (Virginia), in Front Royal
Skyline High School (Washington), in Sammamish